The Bad River is a  river in Michigan. It rises in Newark Township near the city of Ithaca in Gratiot County and flows in a north-easterly direction into Saginaw County, and through the village of St. Charles, before emptying into the Shiawassee River within the bounds of the Shiawassee National Wildlife Refuge.

Land use within the surrounding watershed is 86.5 percent agricultural; as a result, the river system has been adversely impacted by sedimentation.

See also
List of rivers of Michigan

References

Rivers of Michigan
Rivers of Gratiot County, Michigan
Rivers of Saginaw County, Michigan
Tributaries of Lake Huron